Sohrol (also Romanized as Sahrol; also known as Sohreqeh, Sokhrul, and Sūhrul) is a village in Rudqat Rural District, Sufian District, Shabestar County, East Azerbaijan Province, Iran. At the 2006 census, its population was 209, in 55 families.

References 

Populated places in Shabestar County